Lieutenant General M. V. Suchindra Kumar AVSM, YSM & bar, VSM is a serving general officer of the Indian Army. He is the current Vice Chief of the Army Staff. He earlier served as the Deputy Chief of the Army Staff (Strategy).

Early life and education
Kumar completed his schooling from the Sainik School, Bijapur. He then attended the National Defence Academy and the Indian Military Academy.

Military career
Kumar was commissioned into the 1st battalion, The Assam Regiment (1 ASSAM) in June 1985. He attended the Defence Services Staff College, Wellington. He served as an instructor at the Infantry School, Mhow. As part of the United Nations, he served as the Sector Senior Operations Officer in the Transitional Authority in Cambodia and in the Indian Army Training team in Lesotho. At Army headquarters, he served in the Military Secretary Branch. He commanded the 59 battalion, The Rashtriya Rifles (Assam). The RR battalions are deployed in a counter-insurgency role in Jammu and Kashmir. He subsequently attended the Higher Command Course at the Army War College, Mhow.

Promoted to the rank of Brigadier, he commanded the 120 Infantry Brigade. For this stint, he was awarded the Yudh Seva Medal on 26 January 2014. He was then selected to attend the National Defence College in New Delhi, as part of the 54th course. After completing the course, he was appointed Brigadier General Staff (BGS) of a corps in the Eastern theatre. On 26 January 2018, he was awarded the Vishisht Seva Medal.

General officer
Kumar was promoted to the rank of Major General and appointed General officer commanding of an infantry division on the line of control. In the 2019 Republic Day honours, he was awarded a bar to the Yudh Seva Medal. He subsequently served in the Military Intelligence directorate as the Additional Director General Military Intelligence (ADGMI). On 14 October 2020, he was promoted to the rank of Lieutenant General and appointed General officer commanding XVI Corps. He took over from Lieutenant General Harsha Gupta at Nagrota. On 1 March 2021, he took over as the Colonel of the Regiment of the Assam Regiment and the Arunachal Scouts. For his tenure as GOC XVI Corps, he was awarded the Ati Vishisht Seva Medal on 26 January 2022. After a year-long stint, he moved to Army HQ as the Director General Military Intelligence (DGMI).

On 1 July 2022, Kumar was appointed Deputy Chief of the Army Staff (Strategy). In March 2023,  Kumar succeeded Lieutenant General B. S. Raju as Vice Chief of the Army Staff, who took over as the General Officer Commanding-in-Chief South Western Command.

Personal life
Kumar is married to Asha Suchindra, an educationalist. The couple has two children. Kumar is an amateur half marathon runner, golf enthusiast and yoga practitioner.

Awards and decorations
Kumar was awarded the Yudh Seva Medal in 2014, the Vishisht Seva Medal in 2018, a bar to the Yudh Seva Medal in 2019 and the Ati Vishisht Seva Medal in 2022.

Dates of rank

References

Living people
Indian generals
Indian Army officers
Recipients of the Ati Vishisht Seva Medal
Recipients of the Yudh Seva Medal
Recipients of the Vishisht Seva Medal
National Defence Academy (India) alumni
Army War College, Mhow alumni
National Defence College, India alumni
Defence Services Staff College alumni
Year of birth missing (living people)